Gudmund Taksdal Kongshavn (born 23 January 1991) is a Norwegian former football goalkeeper.

He was born in Oslo, moved with his family to Bergen as a small child and played for IL Varegg before joining Vålerenga's youth team ahead of the 2008 season. He made his Norwegian Premier League debut on 26 July 2009 against Odd Grenland; despite not even being considered a part of the senior squad at the time. Before the 2015 season he signed a contract for Tromsø. Before the 2020 season he signed for Aalesund.

In February 2021, he signed a contract with Liga I side Dinamo București. In June 2021 Kongshavn decide to retire to spend time with family and work for the organization MOT.

Career statistics

Club

Honours

Norway U21
UEFA European Under-21 Championship bronze: 2013

References

1991 births
Living people
Footballers from Bergen
Norwegian footballers
Association football goalkeepers
Norway youth international footballers
Eliteserien players
Liga I players
Vålerenga Fotball players
Sarpsborg 08 FF players
Tromsø IL players
Aalesunds FK players
FC Dinamo București players
Norwegian expatriate footballers
Expatriate footballers in Romania
Norwegian expatriate sportspeople in Romania